Budd Lake may refer to:

Communities
Budd Lake, New Jersey, an unincorporated community in Morris County

Lakes
Budd Lake (California), in Yosemite National Park
Budd Lake (Michigan), in Clare County
Budd Lake (Clearwater County, Minnesota)
Budd Lake (Martin County, Minnesota)
Budd Lake (New Jersey), in Morris County